Nebria saurica is a species of ground beetle in the Nebriinae subfamily that is endemic to Kazakhstan. The species can be found in Tarbagatai and Saur Mountains, from which the name have been taken.

References

saurica
Beetles described in 1976
Beetles of Asia
Endemic fauna of Kazakhstan